Khaneh-ye Barq-e Isa Khani (also Romanized as Khāneh-ye Barq-e ‘Īsá Khānī; also known as ‘Īsá Khānī and Tāzeh Kand-e ‘Īsá Khānī) is a village in Benajuy-ye Gharbi Rural District, in the Central District of Bonab County, East Azerbaijan Province, Iran. At the 2006 census, its population was 34, in 9 families.

References 

Populated places in Bonab County